Sir Henry Creswicke Rawlinson, 1st Baronet,  KLS (5 April 1810 – 5 March 1895) was a British East India Company army officer, politician and Orientalist, sometimes described as the Father of Assyriology. His son, also Henry, was to become a senior commander in the British Army during World War I.

Early life and army service
Rawlinson was born on 5 April 1810, at the place now known as Chadlington, Oxfordshire, England. He was the second son of Abram Tyack Rawlinson, and elder brother of the historian George Rawlinson. In 1827, having become proficient in the Persian language, he was sent to Persia in company with other British officers to drill and reorganize the Shah's troops. Disagreements between the Persian court and the British government ended in the departure of the British officers.

Rawlinson began to study Persian inscriptions, more particularly those in the cuneiform character, which had only been partially deciphered by Grotefend and Saint-Martin. From 1836 he was in the vicinity of the great cuneiform inscription at Behistun, near the city of Kermanshah in western Iran, for two years. He was the first Westerner to transcribe the Old Persian portion of the trilingual inscriptions in Old Persian, Elamite and Babylonian (a later form of Akkadian) written by Darius the Great sometime between his coronation as king of the Persian Empire in the summer of 522 BC and his death in autumn of 486 BC. Rawlinson was able to send a full and accurate transcription to Europe in 1847 and, with his knowledge of Old Persian, was eventually able to decipher the Elamite and Babylonian sections.

Political career

Rawlinson was appointed political agent at Kandahar in 1840. In that capacity he served for three years, his political labours being considered as meritorious as was his gallantry during various engagements in the course of the Afghan War; for these he was rewarded by the distinction of Companion of the Order of the Bath in 1844.

Serendipitously, he became known personally to the governor-general, which resulted in his appointment as political agent in Ottoman Arabia.  Thus he settled in Baghdad, where he devoted himself to cuneiform studies. He was now able, with considerable difficulty and at no small personal risk, to make a complete transcript of the Behistun inscription, which he was also successful in deciphering and interpreting. Having collected a large amount of invaluable information on this and kindred topics, in addition to much geographical knowledge gained in the prosecution of various explorations (including visits with Sir Austen Henry Layard to the ruins of Nineveh), he returned to England on leave of absence in 1849.

He was elected a Fellow of the Royal Society in February 1850 on account of being "The Discoverer of the key to the Ancient Persian, Babylonian, and Assyrian Inscriptions in the Cuneiform character. The Author of various papers on the philology, antiquities, and Geography of Mesopotamia and Central Asia. Eminent as a Scholar".

Rawlinson remained at home for two years, published in 1851 his memoir on the Behistun inscription, and was promoted to the rank of lieutenant-colonel. He disposed of his valuable collection of Babylonian, Sabaean, and Sassanian antiquities to the trustees of the British Museum, who also made him a considerable grant to enable him to carry on the Assyrian and Babylonian excavations initiated by Layard. During 1851 he returned to Baghdad. The excavations were performed by his direction with valuable results, among the most important being the discovery of material that contributed greatly to the final decipherment and interpretation of the cuneiform character. Rawlinson's greatest contribution to the deciphering of the cuneiform scripts was the discovery that individual signs had multiple readings depending on their context. While at the British Museum, Rawlinson worked with the younger George Smith.

An equestrian accident in 1855 hastened his determination to return to England, and in that year he resigned his post in the East India Company. Prior to his return, Rawlinson was involved in the ill-fated French mission to ship over 200 cases of antiquities to London, Paris and Berlin that were mostly lost at Al-Qurnah.

On his return to England the distinction of Knight Commander of the Order of the Bath was conferred upon him, and he was appointed a crown director of the East India Company.

The remaining forty years of his life were full of activity—political, diplomatic, and scientific—and were spent mainly in London. In 1858 he was appointed a member of the first India Council, but resigned during 1859 on being sent to Persia as envoy extraordinary and minister plenipotentiary. The latter post he held for only a year, owing to his dissatisfaction with circumstances concerning his official position there.  Previously he had sat in Parliament as Member of Parliament (MP) for Reigate from February to September 1858; he was again MP for Frome, from 1865 to 1868. He was appointed to the Council of India again in 1868, and continued to serve upon it until his death. He was a strong advocate of the forward policy in Afghanistan, and counselled the retention of Kandahar.

Attitudes concerning Russia 

Rawlinson was one of the most important figures arguing that Britain must check Russian ambitions in South Asia. He was a strong advocate of the forward policy in Afghanistan, and counselled the retention of Kandahar. He argued that Tsarist Russia would attack and absorb Khokand, Bokhara and Khiva (which they did – they are now parts of Uzbekistan) and warned they would invade Persia (present-day Iran) and Afghanistan as springboards to British India.

Later life
He was a trustee of the British Museum from 1876 till his death. He was created Knight Grand Cross of the Order of the Bath in 1889, and a Baronet in 1891; was president of the Royal Geographical Society from 1874 to 1875, and of the Royal Asiatic Society from 1869 to 1871 and 1878 to 1881; and received honorary degrees at Oxford, Cambridge, and Edinburgh.

He married Louisa Caroline Harcourt Seymour, daughter of Jane (née Hopkinson) and Henry Seymour, on 2 September 1862, with whom he had two sons: Henry and Alfred. He was widowed on 31 October 1889 and died in London of influenza five years later. He is buried in Brookwood Cemetery in Surrey.

Published works

Rawlinson's published works include four volumes of cuneiform inscriptions, published under his direction between 1870 and 1884 by the trustees of the British Museum; The Persian Cuneiform Inscription at Behistun (1846–1851) and Outline of the History of Assyria (1852), both reprinted from the Asiatic Society's journals; A Commentary on the Cuneiform Inscriptions of Babylon and Assyria (1850); Notes on the Early History of Babylonia (1854); and England and Russia in the East (1875). He also made a variety of minor contributions to the publications of learned societies. He contributed articles on Baghdad, the Euphrates and Kurdistan to the ninth edition of the Encyclopædia Britannica, together with several other articles dealing with the East; and he assisted in editing a translation of The Histories of Herodotus by his brother, Canon George Rawlinson.

Works

References

Footnotes

Bibliography

External links

Further reading

19th-century Anglicans
19th-century archaeologists
19th-century English writers
19th-century translators
1810 births
1895 deaths
British Army generals
Baronets in the Baronetage of the United Kingdom
British East India Company Army officers
British military personnel of the First Anglo-Afghan War
Burials at Brookwood Cemetery
Directors of the British East India Company
English Assyriologists
English philologists
Fellows of the Royal Society
Knights Grand Cross of the Order of the Bath
Members of the Council of India
Members of the Parliament of the United Kingdom for English constituencies
Middle Eastern studies scholars
People from West Oxfordshire District
Presidents of the Royal Asiatic Society
Presidents of the Royal Geographical Society
Recipients of the Pour le Mérite (civil class)
Translators from Old Persian
Military personnel from Oxfordshire
Trustees of the British Museum
UK MPs 1857–1859
UK MPs 1865–1868
Victorian writers
Assyriologists